Balsam is a group of plant products derived from various plants.

Balsam may also refer to:

Plants
 Balsaminaceae, the balsam family
 Impatiens, a genus of the balsam family
 Abies balsamea, an evergreen tree commonly known as the balsam fir
 Fraser fir, sometimes considered a subspecies and referred to as "she-balsam"
 Picea rubens, or red spruce, also called "he-balsam"

People
 Artur Balsam (1906–1994), pianist
 Isaac Balsam (1880–1945), founder of the Balsam Dairy Farm
 Martin Balsam (1919–1996), actor
 Paul Balsam (1905–1972), New York Supreme Court Justice
 Talia Balsam (born 1959), American actress

Places
 Balsam, Michigan, an unincorporated community
 The Balsams Grand Resort Hotel in Dixville Notch, New Hampshire
 Balsam, North Carolina, a town in the US
 Great Balsam Mountains of North Carolina
 Balsam Lake (Wisconsin), a lake in Wisconsin

Other
 Balsam (drink), liqueur made with herbs
 Riga Black Balsam (Rīgas Melnais balzams), a traditional Latvian herbal liqueur
 Tincture of benzoin, also known as Friar's balsam

See also
 Basamum
 Balm of Gilead
 Balsamic vinegar
 Balsam apple
 Balsam pear (disambiguation)